Kevin Kimmage (born 5 May 1967) is an Irish former cyclist. He competed in two events at the 1992 Summer Olympics.

References

External links
 

1967 births
Living people
Irish male cyclists
Olympic cyclists of Ireland
Cyclists at the 1992 Summer Olympics
Place of birth missing (living people)
Rás Tailteann winners